Garigliano may refer to:

Garigliano, a river in central Italy
Garigliano, a name used on the west coast of Italy for Tramontane, a cold wind from the north or northeast
Battle of Garigliano : could refer to 
Battle of Garigliano (457), a 457 battle 
Battle of Garigliano, a 915 battle
Battle of Garigliano (1503), a 1503 battle
Battle of Garigliano (1860), a 1860 battle